Robert Horne may refer to:

Politicians
Bob Horne (born 1939), Australian politician
Robert Horne (MP), son of MP Henry Horne
Robert Horne, 1st Viscount Horne of Slamannan (1871–1940), British politician

Sports
Robert Horne (cricketer), Olympic cricketer
Robert Horne (wrestler) (born 1964), American wrestler
Rob Horne (born 1989), Australian rugby union player
Robert Van Horne (American football), American football coach

Others
Robert Horne (bishop) (c. 1510s-1579), bishop of Winchester
Robert Van Horne (born 1948), American pianist and composer
Rob Horne (professor), professor of behavioural medicine
Robert Horne (virologist), virologist and microscopy expert

See also
 Robert Horn (disambiguation)